Busted may refer to:

Music
 Busted (band), an English rock band

Albums
 Busted (2002 Busted album), the debut album by the band
 Busted (2004 Busted album), a compilation album by the band 
 Busted (Cheap Trick album) or the title song, 1990

Songs
 "Busted" (Harlan Howard song), 1962
 "Busted" (Isley Brothers song), 2003
 "Busted" (Joanne song), 2001
 "Busted", by the Black Keys from The Big Come Up, 2002
 "Busted", by Candace Flynn and Vanessa Doofenshmirtz from Phineas and Ferb
 "Busted", by Matchbox 20 from Yourself or Someone Like You, 1996
 "Busted", by Vitamin C from More, 2001

Television
 Busted!, a 2018–2021 South Korean streaming show
 MTV's Busted, a reality show that began airing in 2008
 "Busted" (Braceface), a 2003 episode
 "Busted" (Foster's Home for Imaginary Friends), a 2004 episode
 "Busted" (Roseanne), a 1994 episode

Other uses
 Busted (book), a 2014 book by Wendy Ruderman and Barbara Laker
 Busted (film), a 1997 comedy film
 Busted (horse) (1963–1988), a British Thoroughbred racehorse
 Busted!, the quarterly newsletter of the Comic Book Legal Defense Fund
 "Busted", a message that appears in Grand Theft Auto games when a protagonist gets arrested

See also
Bust (disambiguation)
Bustard, a family of birds